Bayoud disease is an epiphytic fungal disease of date palm.
The pathogen responsible for the disease is Fusarium oxysporum f.sp. albedinis.

The disease was first reported from Morocco in 1870. The word "bayoud" is derived from the Arabic abiadh ("white"), and is a reference to the whitish discoloration of diseased fronds.

References

Further reading 

Fungal plant pathogens and diseases
Palm diseases
Food plant pathogens and diseases